Ebaeides arcuosus is a species of beetle in the family Cerambycidae. It was described by Holzschuh in 1998.

References

Ebaeides
Beetles described in 1998